The 1941 Sam Houston State Bearkats football team represented Sam Houston State Teachers College (now known as Sam Houston State University) as a member of the Lone Star Conference (LSC)  during the 1941 college football season. Led by fourth-year head coach Puny Wilson, the Bearkats compiled an overall record of 2–7–1 with a mark of 1–3 in conference play, and finished fourth in the LSC.

Schedule

References

Sam Houston State
Sam Houston Bearkats football seasons
Sam Houston State Bearkats football